"Feel No Pain" is a song by English band Sade from their fourth studio album, Love Deluxe (1992). It was released as the album's second single on 16 November 1992.

Critical reception
Justin Chadwick from Albumism described the song as a "percussive" and "compassionate call-to-arms that reminds us to treat the poverty-stricken with the dignity and decency they deserve, while encouraging us to do what we can to ease people's suffering in times of financial turmoil and family upheaval." Larry Flick from Billboard noted it as a "luscious slow jam", and stated that it's "by far, the album's most accessible cut." He added, "A creative shuffle beat is embellished with subtle and bluesy guitar picking and steamy keyboard passages. Of course, Sade's unique voice is the focal point at all times." The Daily Vault's Mark Millan stated that a serious song "comes off as a cool, breezy, and somewhat groovy funk song." He noted that "the icy vocals are in complete contrast with the club-ready, slow-burning track." 

A reviewer from Music & Media commented, "Laid back but nonetheless driven, the second single from the Love Deluxe album is not completely painless, because the repetitive bass pattern makes you tap your feet until they hurt, especially through Nellee Hooper's dance remix." Frank Guan from Vulture wrote, "All Sade songs are socially engaged at some level, but of the ones that directly reference politics, this is one of the best. Instead of telling the story of a black family trapped by layoffs, poverty, unemployment, and hatred from the third-person, Sade locates herself within its daughter as a first-person narrator. Her intimation that a society that refuses to support its least fortunate members will end in ruin for all doesn't come off as a sermon, but an experience deeply lived. The supporting cast turns in one of its best performances, evoking a spirit at once buoyant, concerned, and trapped."

Track listings

UK and European 7-inch single
A. "Feel No Pain" – 5:08
B. "Love Is Stronger Than Pride" (Mad Professor remix) – 4:25

US 7-inch single
A. "Feel No Pain" – 3:45
B. "Love Is Stronger Than Pride" (Mad Professor remix) – 4:25

UK and European 12-inch single
A1. "Feel No Pain" (Nellee Hooper remix) – 5:09
A2. "Feel No Pain" (album version) – 5:07
B1. "Love Is Stronger Than Pride" (Mad Professor remix) – 4:25
B2. "Feel No Pain" (Nellee's bonus beats) – 3:12

European CD single / Japanese mini CD single / US and Dutch cassette single
"Feel No Pain" – 3:47
"Love Is Stronger Than Pride" (Mad Professor remix) – 4:27

UK and European CD maxi single
"Feel No Pain" (album version) – 5:08
"Love Is Stronger Than Pride" (Mad Professor remix) – 4:25
"Feel No Pain" (version) – 5:29

UK CD single – Nellee Hooper Mixes
"Feel No Pain" (Nellee Hooper remix) – 5:09
"Feel No Pain" (album version) – 5:07
"Love Is Stronger Than Pride" (Mad Professor remix) – 4:25
"Feel No Pain" (Nellee's bonus beats) – 3:12

Charts

References

1992 singles
1992 songs
Epic Records singles
Sade (band) songs
Song recordings produced by Mike Pela
Songs about poverty
Songs written by Sade (singer)
Songs written by Stuart Matthewman